First Chester & Wirral was a British bus operator operating in the Cheshire and Merseyside regions between February 1990 and January 2013. It was a subsidiary of FirstGroup.

History
In February 1990, the Chester, Ellesmere Port and Rock Ferry depots of Crosville Motor Services were sold by the Drawlane Group to Potteries Motor Traction with 150 buses.

It was included in the sale of Potteries Motor Traction to Badgerline, which in June 1995 became part of FirstBus. The company was later split, with the original Potteries Motor Traction becoming First Staffordshire & South Cheshire and the north Cheshire and Wirral operations, First Chester & The Wirral.

On 19 June 2007, the ChesterBus municipal bus company was purchased from Chester City Council and integrated into the Chester depot.

First Chester & The Wirral remained part of First Potteries until 2010, when the company was reorganised, with the Staffordshire operation reporting to First Midlands and the Chester & Wirral operations to First Manchester.

On 12 November 2012, First Chester & Wirral was sold to Stagecoach Merseyside & South Lancashire with 110 vehicles and 290 staff. The sale was concluded on 13 January 2013 and is now operated as Stagecoach in Chester & Wirral.

References

External links

 
Company website

FirstGroup bus operators in England
Transport in Cheshire
Historic transport in Merseyside
1990 establishments in England
2013 disestablishments in England